Indira Chunda Thita Syahrul (born 7 April 1979) is an Indonesian politician and the daughter of Syahrul Yasin Limpo. She was elected in 2014 from the South Sulawesi I electoral district as a member of the People's Representative Council and served in the Commission IV. She studied management at the Hasanuddin University in Makassar from 1997 to 2004 and from 2005 to 2007.

Born into a family, which has dominated local politics for generations, she has become active in politics along cousins and a brother who is active in the city's parliament.

References

Members of the People's Representative Council, 2014
1979 births
Living people